Woizero Mary Tadesso or Mary Tadesse is an Ethiopian politician.

She served as Minister of Education.

She has published her diary-based memoirs: My Life, My Ethiopia.

References

Government ministers of Ethiopia
20th-century Ethiopian women politicians
20th-century Ethiopian politicians
Women government ministers of Ethiopia
20th-century Ethiopian writers
20th-century diarists
20th-century memoirists